The Stade Maurice Dufrasne is a football stadium in Liège, Belgium. The stadium holds 27,670 people. It is also known as Stade de Sclessin, from the name of the district of Liège where it is located, and is the home stadium of Standard Liège. Belgium have also played here, notably against Estonia in September 2008 in a 2010 World Cup Qualifier and against Gibraltar on 31 August 2017 in a World Cup Qualifier. The stadium hosted one match at Euro 1972 and three matches at Euro 2000.

The stadium's namesake, Maurice Dufrasne, was Chairman of Standard Liège from 1909 (when the stadium was built) until 1931. He was known to take players to his home and cook them a meal if they played well, especially at home fixtures.

Euro 1972 match

Euro 2000 matches

References

External links

 Stade de Sclessin stadiumguide.com

UEFA Euro 1972 stadiums
UEFA Euro 2000 stadiums in Belgium
Football venues in Wallonia
Sports venues in Liège Province
Buildings and structures in Liège
Sport in Liège
Standard Liège